Thousand Years of Love is a 2003 South Korean television series starring Sung Yu-ri, So Ji-sub and Kim Nam-jin. It aired on SBS from March 22 to May 25, 2003 on Saturdays and Sundays at 21:45 for 20 episodes.

Plot
Over a thousand years ago during the Baekje Dynasty, there was a princess unlike any other. Skilled in both arts and athletics, the beautiful Princess Buyeo Ju is beloved by royals and citizens alike. When Baekje is betrayed by the spy Kum-hwa, Buyeo Ju even steals the heart of her kingdom's conqueror, Silla general Kim Yu-seok. But alas, her love lies with her protector, General Guishil Ari. Determined to have the princess, Kim Yu-seok kills Guishil Ari, but Buyeo Ju chooses death over submission. When she jumps off a cliff, however, she is mysteriously time warped into the future. In present-day Korea (2003), Buyeo Ju again meets the two men of her life, reincarnated as aimless but warm-hearted fashion designer Kang In-chul and Japanese tycoon Fujiwara Tatsuji. The two men have no idea about their past lives, but Tatsuji begins to feel a mysterious attraction towards Buyeo Ju. Despite her fear that history will repeat itself, Buyeo Ju finds herself falling for In-chul, in a fateful romance spanning from ancient Korea to modern times.

Cast
Sung Yu-ri as Princess Buyeo Ju
So Ji-sub as General Guishil Ari / Kang In-chul
Kim Nam-jin as General Kim Yu-seok / Fujiwara Tatsuji
Kim Sa-rang as Kum-hwa / Go Eun-bi
Lee Mi-young as Chae Yeo-sa, Eun-bi's mother
Park Chil-yong as Go Bong-su, Eun-bi's father
Im Chae-moo as Doctor Uhm
Kwon Ki-sun as Doctor Uhm's wife
Yang Taek-jo as Tatsuji's housekeeper
Lee Ki-young as Kim Cheon-chul, gangster boss
Kim Tae-yeon as Yeo-rang
Lee Sun-kyun as Pil-ga
Han Tae-yoon as Sook-hee
 Ha Joo-hee as Junko, Tatsuji's ex-girlfriend

International broadcast
 It aired in Vietnam from April 3, 2004 on HTV7.

References

External links
  
 
 

2003 South Korean television series debuts
2003 South Korean television series endings
Seoul Broadcasting System television dramas
South Korean time travel television series
South Korean romantic fantasy television series